The Council of Ministers of Guatemala governs the country.

List of cabinets 

 Cabinet of Alejandro Giammattei
 Cabinet of Alejandro Maldonado
 Cabinet of Jimmy Morales
 Cabinet of Otto Pérez Molina

References

See also 

 Ministries of Guatemala
 Politics of Guatemala

Politics of Guatemala
Guatemala